Osei Kwame Despite (born 2 February 1962) is a Ghanaian entrepreneur and a philanthropist with a foundation in music creation and knowledge of the broadcasting sector. Osei-Kwame is the CEO of the Despite Firm Ltd, a trade company with subsidiaries in the media industry, including UTV, PEACE FM, OKAY FM, NEAT FM and HELLO FM in Kumasi. He was named Africa Entrepreneur of the Year at the African Achievers Awards in the United Kingdom in 2021.  He was also honored with GH CAPTAIN's Award in 2019 for his contributions to the socio-economic development of the country.

Early life 
In the Ghanaian town of Agona Wiamoase, he was born, in the Ashanti region. He began his career as a merchant in Dunkwa-Offinso, Ghana's Central Region, selling music cassettes, feeding bottles, padlocks, and other items. After years of struggling to make ends meet in the countryside, he and his colleagues relocated to Lagos, Nigeria.

In 1983, he returned to Ghana with other Ghanaians who had fled Nigeria due to the country's political unrest. Back to his country, he only had a trident cassette player and a chain-saw machine. He started a timber contracting business with the chain-saw machine, but it was smashed by a falling tree on his first business trip.  He eventually moved on to selling cassette tapes before diversifying his business.

Career 
To show his support for the local music industry and to prioritize Ghanaian culture, he moved into radio and founded the PeaceFM at Achimota Mile 7 Junction in 1999. The station's experiments with the Akan language paid off, as radio listeners looking for local programming abandoned stations broadcasting primarily in the Queen's language on the 104.3 frequency. The radio industry flourished, culminating in the establishment of Hello FM in Kumasi and OkayFM in Accra, as well as peacefmonline.com.

List of Companies 
Now, the Despite Group of Companies (DGC) has the following companies;

 U2 Company Limited (Iodated Salt Production)
 Okay FM
 Peace FM
 Neat FM  
 Hello FM  
 Despite Stores  
 Best Point Savings and Loans (Finance)  
 Farming and Building Construction businesses
 Neat Foods Company Limited (which produces and markets NEAT Fufu, NEAT Banku, NEAT Abenkwan, NEAT Hausa Koko, NEAT Dairy Products)
 United Television Company Limited 
 Atona Foods LTD ( which produces THIS WAY chocolate drink which comes in different flavors, and the THIS WAY Motherlac children's cereal )

Personal life 
Despite has a wife and nine children. Kennedy Osei Asante, his first son, is the General Manager of Despite Media. In 2019, he married Tracy in an expensive ceremony that drew the attention of many people both inside and outside the country. He is noted for collecting luxurious vehicles and has a great love for exotic cars. He purchased a 3'000'000$ Bugatti Chiron in February 2022 to mark his 60th birthday, making him one of just 5 individuals in Africa who own a Bugatti.

References 

1962 births
Living people
Ghanaian businesspeople
21st-century businesspeople
21st-century philanthropists